The 1965–66 Intertoto Cup was won by 1. FC Lokomotive Leipzig, who had lost the previous season's final (under their previous name of SC Leipzig). They defeated IFK Norrköping. After experimenting with twelve groups totalling 48 clubs for two years (although latterly only 44 clubs were recruited to fill eleven groups), the competition returned to its original format with 32 clubs divided into eight groups. As a result, the clubs went straight to the Quarter-finals after the Group Stage, while in previous seasons a First Round had also been required.

Group stage
The teams were divided into eight groups of four clubs each. Clubs from the Netherlands, Sweden, Switzerland and West Germany were placed in 'A' groups; while clubs from Czechoslovakia, East Germany, Poland and Yugoslavia were placed in 'B' groups. The eight group winners advanced to the knock-out rounds.

Group A1

Group A2

Group A3

Group A4

Group B1

Group B2

Group B3
 Željezničar became prohibited from international competition by the Yugoslav FA, so SC Leipzig advanced to the knock-out rounds instead

Group B4

Quarter-finals

1 Chemie Leipzig progressed to the Semi-finals on a coin toss.

Semi-finals

1 Norrköping progressed to the Final on a coin toss.

Final
 SC Leipzig were renamed Lokomotive Leipzig before the Final

See also
 1965–66 European Cup
 1965–66 UEFA Cup Winners' Cup
 1965–66 Inter-Cities Fairs Cup

External links
 Intertoto Cup 1965–66 by Karel Stokkermans at RSSSF
  by Pawel Mogielnicki

UEFA Intertoto Cup
4